The Final Countdown is a 1980 American science fiction war film about a modern nuclear-powered aircraft carrier that travels through time to the day before the December 7, 1941, attack on Pearl Harbor. Produced by Peter Douglas and Lloyd Kaufman (founder of Troma Entertainment) and directed by Don Taylor, the film contains an ensemble cast starring Kirk Douglas, Martin Sheen, James Farentino, Katharine Ross and Charles Durning.

This was the final film by Don Taylor. Kaufman also served as an associate producer and had a minor acting role.

The film was produced with the cooperation of the United States Navy's naval aviation branch and the United States Department of Defense. It was set and filmed on board  (CVN-68), filming operations of the modern nuclear warship, which had been launched in the early 1970s. The Final Countdown was a moderate success at the box office.

Plot
In 1980, the aircraft carrier  was departing Naval Station Pearl Harbor for naval exercises in the mid-Pacific Ocean. The ship takes on a civilian observer, Warren Lasky (Martin Sheen) — a systems analyst for Tideman Industries working as an efficiency expert for the U.S. Defense Department — on the orders of his reclusive employer, Mr. Tideman, whose secretive major defense contractor company designed and built the nuclear-powered warship.

Once at sea, the Nimitz encounters a mysterious electrically charged storm-like vortex. While the ship passes through it, radar and other equipment become unresponsive and everyone aboard falls into agony. Initially unsure of what has happened to them and having lost radio contact with U.S. Pacific Fleet Command at Pearl Harbor, Captain Yelland (Kirk Douglas), commander of the aircraft carrier, fears that there may have been a nuclear strike on Hawaii or the continental United States. He orders general quarters and launches a RF-8 Crusader reconnaissance aircraft. The aircraft returns after photographing Pearl Harbor, but the images show an intact row of U.S. Pacific fleet battleships, of which several were destroyed during the Japanese attack on Pearl Harbor on December 7, 1941.

When a surface contact is spotted on radar, Yelland launches two ready alert Grumman F-14 Tomcat fighter jets from VF-84 to intercept. The patrol witnesses a civilian wooden yacht being strafed and destroyed by two Imperial Japanese Navy Mitsubishi A6M "Zero" fighters, killing three crew members. The F-14s are ordered to drive off the Zeros without firing, but when the Zeros inadvertently head towards the Nimitz, Yelland gives clearance to shoot them down. The Nimitz rescues survivors from the yacht: prominent U.S. Senator Samuel Chapman (Charles Durning), his aide Laurel Scott (Katharine Ross), her dog Charlie and one of the two downed Zero pilots (Soon-Tek Oh). Commander Owens (James Farentino), an amateur historian, recognizes Chapman as a politician who could have been Franklin D. Roosevelt's running mate (and his potential successor) during his final re-election bid, had Chapman not disappeared shortly before the Pearl Harbor attack.

When a Grumman E-2 Hawkeye scouting craft discovers the Japanese fleet task force further north in unpatrolled waters, poised to launch its attack on Pearl Harbor, the Nimitz crew realize that they have been transported back in time to the day before the attack. Yelland has to decide whether to destroy the Japanese fleet and alter the course of history or to stand by and allow history to proceed as they know it. The American civilians and the Zero pilot are kept isolated, but while being questioned, the Japanese pilot forcibly obtains an M-16 rifle from one of the guards, kills two of the other U.S. Marine guards, and takes Scott, Owens, and Lasky hostage. He threatens to kill them unless he is given access to a radio to warn the Japanese fleet about the Nimitz. Lasky tells Commander Owens to recite and describe the secret plans for the Japanese attack; the dumbfounded Japanese pilot is overcome and shot and killed by the other U.S. Marines of the on-board detachment on Nimitz. In the aftermath, Scott and Owens develop an attraction for each other.

Chapman is outraged that Yelland knows of the impending Japanese attack but has not told anyone else, and demands to be taken to Pearl Harbor to warn the naval authorities. Yelland instead orders Owens to fly the civilians and sufficient supplies via helicopter to an isolated Hawaiian island, assuming they will eventually be rescued. When they arrive, Chapman realizes he has been tricked and uses a flare gun to force the pilot to fly to Pearl Harbor. During a struggle with another crew member, the flare gun discharges, destroying the craft and stranding Scott and Owens on the island. The Nimitz launches a massive strike force against the incoming Japanese fleet, but right after that, the time vortex storm returns. After a futile attempt to outrun the storm, Yelland recalls the strike force, and the ship and its aircraft safely return to 1980, leaving the past relatively unchanged. Upon the return of the Nimitz to Pearl Harbor, Pacific Fleet admirals board the ship to investigate the Nimitzs unexplained disappearance. Lasky leaves the ship with Scott's dog, Charlie, and encounters the mysterious Mr. Tideman face-to-face. Tideman is revealed to be a much older Owens. He and his wife, Laurel Scott, invite Lasky to join them as they have "a lot to talk about".

Cast

 Kirk Douglas as Captain Matthew Yelland, Commanding Officer, USS Nimitz. He was the father of the film's producer.
 Martin Sheen as Warren Lasky
 Katharine Ross as Laurel Scott
 James Farentino as Commander Dick Owens, Commander, Air Group of Carrier Air Wing 8, later appearing under the identity of Richard Tideman, head of Tideman Industries.
 Ron O'Neal as Commander Dan Thurman, Executive Officer, USS Nimitz
 Charles Durning as Senator Samuel S. Chapman
 Victor Mohica as Black Cloud, USS Nimitz weather officer 
 James Coleman as Lieutenant Perry (credited as James C. Lawrence)
 Soon-Tek Oh as Imperial Japanese Navy Air Service Pilot Shimura
 Joe Lowry as Commander Damon
 Alvin Ing as Lieutenant Kajima
 Mark Thomas as Marine Corporal Kullman
 Harold Bergman as Bellman
 Richard Liberty as Lieutenant Commander Moss
 Lloyd Kaufman as Lieutenant Commander Kaufman
 Dan Fitzgerald as Doctor
 Peter Douglas as Quartermaster

Production

Peter Douglas was the driving force behind The Final Countdown. With a limited budget and a promising script, he was able to attract interest from the U.S. Navy. Officials from the Department of Defense offered full cooperation after seeing a script, but insisted that for safety and operational readiness, the film schedule would be dependent on the "on location" naval consultant, William Micklos. Principal photography took place at Naval Air Station Key West, Naval Station Norfolk, and off the Florida Keys, over two five-week periods in 1979. Scenes at Pearl Harbor consisted of mainly stock footage with most of The Final Countdown exteriors shot on the Nimitz while at sea, and at drydock for interiors. During operations, an emergency landing took place with the production crew allowed to film the recovery of the aircraft on the Nimitz; the sequence appeared in the final film.

Crew members of the Nimitz were used as extras, a few with speaking parts; a total of 48 of the crew appear as "actors" in the final credits. The difficulties in filming a modern jet fighter were soon apparent when the first setup to record an F-14 takeoff at Naval Station Norfolk, Virginia, resulted in both camera and operator being pitched down a runway.

Dissension in the production crew led to major changes during location shooting, with a number of the crew being fired and replaced. Taylor's direction was considered workmanlike, as he had a reputation for bringing projects in on time and on budget, but suggestions from U.S. naval aviators were ultimately incorporated into the shooting schedules with the "B" crew placed in charge of all the aerial sequences that became the primary focus of the film.

In order to film the aerial sequences, Panavision cameras were mounted on naval aircraft while camera-equipped aircraft and helicopters were leased from Tallmantz Aviation, including a Bell 206 Jet Ranger helicopter, a Learjet 35, and a B-25 bomber converted into a camera platform. Three Mitsubishi A6M Zero replicas, originally built for the film Tora! Tora! Tora! (1970), were flown by pilots from the Confederate Air Force, now called the Commemorative Air Force. Two of the replicas were featured in a dogfight with F-14 Tomcats; it was the first time such a dissimilar engagement had appeared in film, with the aircraft's' "totally different speeds...environments and weaponry".

In one scene where an F-14 "thumps" a Zero by flying under and streaking upward in front of the slower aircraft, the resultant "jet blast" of turbulent air was so intense that the yokes of both of the Zeros in the scene were violently wrenched out of the pilots' hands and caused both aircraft to momentarily tumble out of control. The lead pilot's headset, along with his watch, were ripped off and out of the open canopy of his Zero, resulting in a few anxious moments as the F-14 pilots were unable to establish contact.

During the climactic attack on Pearl Harbor, scenes reproduced in monochrome from Tora! Tora! Tora! featured Aichi D3A Val dive bombers, Mitsubishi A6M Zero fighters and Nakajima B5N Kate torpedo bombers.

Aircraft appearing in the production

 Douglas EA-3B Skywarrior
 Grumman F-14A Tomcat
 Grumman E-2 Hawkeye
 Grumman A-6E Intruder
 Grumman EA-6B Prowler
 Lockheed S-3 Viking
 LTV A-7E Corsair II
 McDonnell Douglas F-4 Phantom II (briefly)
 North American RA-5C Vigilante (briefly)
 North American T-6 Texan modified to resemble Mitsubishi A6M Zero
 North American T-6 Texan modified to resemble Nakajima B5N Kate
 Sikorsky SH-3 Sea King
 Vought RF-8G Crusader
 Vultee BT-13 Valiant modified to resemble Aichi D3A Val

Release
The Final Countdown was released to theaters in the United States on August 1, 1980. A novelization by Martin Caidin, based on the screenplay, was released in the same month and largely dovetailed with the film presented on screen (the novelization ending with Lasky accompanying Tideman/CDR Owens and Laurel to their home, where it is revealed that the time travel phenomenon explored in the film had an extraterrestrial origin that is not further expanded upon).

Home video
The film was released on home video, on March 30, 2004. It was later released by Blue Underground on a two-DVD set (with both full-screen and widescreen formats) and a special two-disc limited edition set with a hologram cover. Each DVD edition was accompanied by special featurettes, including a "behind-the-scenes" documentary and a commentary track by the producer and other studio principals. On November 4, 2008, a high-definition two-disc Blu-ray set was released, but lacked some of the earlier background materials. A 4K Ultra High-Definition disc set was released in May 2021 as a limited edition with some additional special features, a copy of the film on Blu-ray disc and a copy of John Scott's original motion picture score on CD.

Reception

Critical reception
The Final Countdown received mixed reviews from critics. On the review aggregator website Rotten Tomatoes, the film received an approval rating of 52% based on 21 reviews, with an average rating of 5.9/10.

Vincent Canby of The New York Times considered it more of an interesting, behind-the-scenes tour of Nimitz: "We see planes landing and taking off with beautiful precision and, just to let us know that things don't always run smoothly on Nimitz, we also see one plane, which has lost its landing hook, landing safely anyway because of the ship's emergency gear". Roger Ebert commented that "logic doesn't matter in a Star Wars(-like) movie". He went on to clarify: "Unfortunately, the movie makes such a mess of it that the biggest element of interest is the aircraft carrier itself". Later reviews concentrated on the intriguing aspect of the time travel story, again stressing that the military hardware was the real star. The U.S. Navy sponsored the film premiere and exploited the film as a recruiting tool to the extent that the theatrical poster appeared in U.S. Navy recruiting offices shortly after the film's release. Ebert and Gene Siskel selected the film as one of their "dogs of the year" in a 1980 episode of Sneak Previews, which surprised some readers of Ebert's column because he gave the film an unimpressed but hardly rancorous 2 stars out of 4 and praised some elements of the production (particularly the details about life on board the aircraft carrier).

Christopher John reviewed The Final Countdown in Ares Magazine #5 and commented that "there is nothing wrong with what is on the screen in Final Countdown; what is on the screen, however, is only half of the film. Maybe someday, like Close Encounters of the Third Kind, someone will go back and put in the missing half-hour of this movie".

Box office
The film grossed $6.1 million in its first 10 days of release from 630 theatres and earned a total of $16.6 million in the United States and Canada.

Awards
 Nominee, Best Science Fiction Film of Year—Saturn Award (Peter Vincent Douglas)
 Nominee, Best Actor—Saturn Award (Kirk Douglas)
 Winner, Golden Screen Award (German box office award)

See also
 Axis of Time trilogy
 G.I. Samurai
 Operation Rainbow – a.k.a. the Philadelphia Experiment, which inspired the film of the latter name
 The Philadelphia Experiment – the reverse story (World War II-era Navy personnel transported through time to the 1980s)
 Zipang

Notes

References

Sources

 Caidin, Martin. The Final Countdown. New York: Bantam, 1980. .
 Dolan, Edward F. Jr. Hollywood Goes to War. London: Bison Books, 1985. .
 Frietas, Gary A. War Movies: The Belle & Blade Guide to Classic War Videos. Bandon, Oregon: Robert D. Reed Publishers, 2011. .
 Kaufman, Lloyd, Trent Haaga, and Adam Jahnke. Make Your Own Damn Movie!: Secrets of a Renegade Director. Los Angeles: L.A. Weekly Books, 2003. .
 Suid, Lawrence H. Guts & Glory: The Making of the American Military Image in Film. Lexington, Kentucky: The University Press of Kentucky, 2002. .
 Toland, John. Infamy: Pearl Harbor and its Aftermath. New York: Berkley, 1991. .

External links
 
 
 
 
 
 

1980 films
1980s science fiction war films
American aviation films
American alternate history films
American science fiction war films
Bryna Productions films
Films directed by Don Taylor
Films scored by John Scott (composer)
Films set in 1941
Films set in 1980
Films set on ships
Pearl Harbor films
Seafaring films
Films about time travel
United Artists films
World War II aviation films
Films about the United States Navy
Films about the United States Navy in World War II
Works about Pacific theatre of World War II
Films set on aircraft carriers
1980s English-language films
1980s American films